Maxim (also Maksim, “Maxym”, or Maksym) is a male first name of Roman origin. It is common in Slavic-speaking countries, mainly in Belarus, Bulgaria, Macedonia, Montenegro, Russia, Serbia, and Ukraine. The name is derived from the Latin family name Maximus, meaning "the greatest". Maxim is also a less well-known surname.

Notable people 
Monarchs:

Đorđe Branković, Despot of Serbia, monastic name Maksim. 

In Christianity:

Maxim of Bulgaria, Patriarch of the Bulgarian Orthodox Church
Serbian Patriarch Maksim I, Patriarch of the Serbian Orthodox Church (1655-1672)

In literature:
Maxim Gorky, Russian author and political activist
Maxim Kalashnikov, Russian author and political activist
Max Stirner, German philosopher

In music:
Max Bemis, an American musician and vocalist of Say Anything
MakSim, a Russian singer
Maksym Berezovsky, a Ukrainian composer and opera singer
Maksim Dunayevsky, a Russian film composer
Maksim Mrvica, a Croatian pianist
Maxim Reality, an English singer-songwriter and MC
Maxim Richarz, a German singer
Maxim Vengerov, a Russian violin virtuoso and conductor

In sport:
Can Maxim Mutaf (born 1991), Turkish-Russian basketball player
Maxim Afinogenov, Russian ice hockey player
Maksim Burchenko, Russian footballer
Maksim Buznikin, Russian footballer
Maksym Chmerkovskiy, Ukrainian ballroom dancer
Maxim Deviatovski, Russian artistic gymnast
Maksim "Max" Grechkin, Israeli footballer
Maksym Kalinichenko, Ukrainian footballer
Maksym Kowal (born 1991), Canadian soccer player
Maxim Marinin, Russian pair skater
Maksim Podholjuzin (born 1992), Estonian footballer
Maksim Romaschenko, Belarusian footballer
Maksim Shatskikh, Uzbek footballer
Maxim Staviski, Russian-born Bulgarian world champion ice dancer
Maksim Zhalmagambetov, Kazakh footballer

In business:
Maksim Moshkow, Russian businessman

In politics:
Maxim Litvinov, Russian revolutionary and diplomat
Maksym Stepanov (born 1975), Ukrainian politician

In fiction:
Maxim Kammerer, fictional character in the Noon Universe series
Maxim de Winter, the second Mrs. de Winter's name for her husband in Rebecca (novel) by Daphne du Maurier
Maxim, the main hero of Lufia II: Rise of the Sinistrals

In crime:
Maksim Gelman, imprisoned for murdering 4 people and attempting to murder 5 others

Articles
Maxim
For people, places or things named Maxim, see .

Maksim
For people, places or things named Maksim, see .

Maksym
For people, places or things named Maksym, see .

Surname 
For people with the surname Maxim, see Maxim (surname).

See also 
Maxim (disambiguation), general disambiguation page
Maxime, the equivalent name in French

References

Russian masculine given names
Ukrainian masculine given names
Belarusian masculine given names
Macedonian masculine given names
Bulgarian masculine given names